This is a list of films which placed number one at the weekend box office for the year 2012 in the Philippines.

*Local Film

References

See also
 Philippine films of the 2010s

Philippines
2012
2012 in Philippine cinema